Antti Edvard Häkkänen (born 16 January 1985 in Mäntyharju, Finland) is a Finnish politician, representing the National Coalition Party. He has served as a Member of Parliament since 2015. From 2017 to 2019, Häkkänen served as Minister of Justice in the Sipilä Cabinet.

Career
Häkkänen graduated from the University of Helsinki with a Master of Law.

Häkkänen served on the Mäntyharjun council from 2009. He was elected as the Youth National Coalition Party leader in 2011 for the 2012-2013 period.

The National Coalition Party nominated Häkkänen as a candidate for the 2014 European Parliament election but he did not gain enough votes. In the 2015 Finnish parliamentary election he was nominated in the newly formed constituency of South-Eastern Finland, and became an elected MP with 6,212 votes.

Häkkänen was elected as one of three vice-chairmen of the National Coalition Party at the party summit in June 2016, with the highest number of votes.

Political views
Antti Häkkänen with other young members of National Coalition Party visited Republican Party (United States) party meeting in 2012. According to Häkkänen, National Coalition Party youth share the financial views of Republican Party in the United States.

Personnel
Mr Tapani Mäkinen  (ex MP of National Coalition Party was named special advisor to Justice Minister Häkkänen in May 2017. Mäkinen resigned in April 2018 due to a police investigation concerning claimed bribery. Mäkinen received juridical charge in August 2019. According to Mäkinen funds he received from mr Juhani Sjöblom (MP candidate of National Coalition Party) (Seepsula Oy) was a legal loan.

References

1985 births
Living people
People from Mäntyharju
National Coalition Party politicians
Ministers of Justice of Finland
Members of the Parliament of Finland (2015–19)
Members of the Parliament of Finland (2019–23)
University of Helsinki alumni